Zorky Stadium is a sports venue in Krasnogorsk, Moscow Oblast, Russia. It is the home of Zorky.

References

Bandy venues in Russia
Sport in Moscow Oblast